The 2016–17 Tennessee State Tigers basketball team represented Tennessee State University during the 2016–17 NCAA Division I men's basketball season. The Tigers, led by third-year head coach Dana Ford, played their home games at the Gentry Complex in Nashville, Tennessee as members of the East Division of the Ohio Valley Conference. They finished the season 17–13, 8–8 in OVC play to finish in a tie for fourth place in the East Division. As the No. 8 seed in the OVC tournament, they lost to Southeast Missouri State in the first round.

Previous season
The Tigers finished the 2015–16 season 20–11, 11–5 in OVC play to finish in a three-way tie for second place in the East Division. They lost in the quarterfinals of the OVC tournament to Austin Peay. They were invited to the CollegeInsider.com Tournament where they lost in the first round to Ball State.

Preseason 
In a vote of Ohio Valley Conference head men’s basketball coaches and sports information directors, Tennessee State was picked to finish in second place in the East Division of the OVC. Tahjere McCall and Wayne Martin were selected to the All-OVC Preseason Team.

Roster

Schedule and results

|-
!colspan=9 style=| Exhibition

|-
!colspan=9 style=| Regular season

|-
!colspan=9 style=|Ohio Valley Conference tournament

References

Tennessee State Tigers basketball seasons
Tennessee State